Deane House may refer to:

in Canada
 Deane House (Fort Calgary), Fort Calgary, Alberta

in the United States
(by state)
 Deane House (Little Rock, Arkansas), listed on the National Register of Historic Places (NRHP)
 Silas Deane House, Wethersfield, Connecticut, NRHP-listed
 Francis Deane Cottage, Uxbridge, Massachusetts, NRHP-listed
 Deane-Williams House, Cambridge, Massachusetts, NRHP-listed
 Deane House (Cofield, North Carolina), NRHP-listed

See also
Dean House (disambiguation)